Friedemann Karl Riehle (born May 30, 1959) is a German conductor.

Riehle was born in Stuttgart.  After violin lessons at a young age he studied classical guitar in Stuttgart as well as orchestra conducting at the Meistersinger Academy in Nuremberg and in Vienna at the Hochschule für Musik und Darstellende Kunst (now Universität für Musik und Darstellende Kunst Wien).
Already as a student he conducted his first opera night with Carl Maria von Weber's opera "Oberon". In 1995, Riehle was one of the people who founded the Prague Philharmonic Orchestra. With this orchestra Riehle cooperates frequently for recordings, for the Prague New Year’s Concert as well as for concerts abroad.  In order to make symphonic music easily accessible for a wider audience and especially for young people, Riehle started in 1997 to cut down long symphonic movements by Anton Bruckner and Gustav Mahler to pieces of a duration of about 7 minutes. This idea inspired many conductors years later.

Also, in order to incorporate epoch-making music of the 20th century into the classical repertoire, Riehle frequently conducts concerts with classical rock music by Deep Purple, Pink Floyd, Led Zeppelin and Queen. Riehle has worked with Ian Gillan of Deep Purple on eleven symphony in rock performances. In August 2015 and 2016 Riehle conducted a rock-concert with the Prague Philharmonic Orchestra in the Vienna State Opera house, called Rock the Opera.

From 1992 to 1995 and from 2009 to 2010, Friedemann Riehle was managing director of the Prague Opera Ball for the Prague State Opera. The Prague Opera Ball is the most famous charity event in the Czech Republic.

References

External links 
Šinkorová se vrací, v drahých šatech provede Plesem v Opeře - iDnes.cz 
Ian Gillan z Deep Purple vystoupí s českými filharmoniky - Magazín CeskeNoviny.cz 
Prague Opera Ball

German male conductors (music)
1959 births
Living people
21st-century German conductors (music)
21st-century German male musicians